Jesús Suárez (9 January 1912 – 27 December 1997) was a Spanish cross-country skier. He competed in the men's 18 kilometre event at the 1936 Winter Olympics.

References

1912 births
1997 deaths
Spanish male cross-country skiers
Olympic cross-country skiers of Spain
Cross-country skiers at the 1936 Winter Olympics
Sportspeople from Gijón